Llettum-ddu is a hamlet in the  community of Tregaron, Ceredigion, Wales, which is 61.3 miles (98.6 km) from Cardiff and 171.7 miles (276.3 km) from London. Llettum-ddu is represented in the Senedd by Elin Jones (Plaid Cymru) and is part of the Ceredigion constituency in the House of Commons.

See also
List of localities in Wales by population

References

Villages in Ceredigion
Tregaron